Esther Schweins (born 18 April 1970 in Oberhausen) is a German actress and comedian who became famous through her appearances on the RTL Samstag Nacht show for which she won the Bayerischer Fernsehpreis in 1994.

Schweins survived the 2004 Indian Ocean earthquake whilst on holiday with her mother in Sri Lanka.

She provided the German voice of Princess Fiona for the dubs of the Shrek franchise.

She has a daughter (born 2007) and a son (born 2008).

In 2018, she played British suffragette and political activist Emmeline Pankhurst in the German docudrama We are half the World (Die Hälfte der Welt gehört uns) about the women's suffrage movement in Germany, France and the United Kingdom.

Selected filmography
 The Superwife (1996)
  (2007)

References

External links 

  
 
 Esther Schweins has practiced yoga since she was 12 years old. Arte Documentary https://www.arte.tv/en/videos/083923-003-A/sacred-varanasi

1968 births
Living people
People from Oberhausen
German women comedians
German television actresses
20th-century German actresses
21st-century German actresses